Ylivääpeli (Överfältväbel in Swedish) is a Finnish military rank above Vääpeli (Fältväbel) and below Sotilasmestari
(Militärmästare).

History and related ranks

The rank was introduced to promote professional NCOs, graduated from Maanpuolustusopisto, in the rank of vääpeli, with a similar purpose as the higher rank of sotilasmestari. Between 1993 and 2007 the rank was not being actively awarded.

See also 
 Finnish military ranks

References 

Military ranks of Finland
Military insignia

fi:Sotilasarvot Suomen puolustusvoimissa
sv:Lista över finländska militära grader